The Meet Group, Inc. (formerly MeetMe) owns several mobile social networking services including MeetMe, hi5, LOVOO, Growlr, Skout, and Tagged. The company has offices in New Hope, Pennsylvania, Philadelphia, San Francisco, Dresden, and Berlin.

Origins

Two high school students, Dave and Catherine Cook, created myYearbook during their Spring break of 2005. They persuaded their older brother Geoff, who had founded EssayEdge and ResumeEdge from his Harvard dorm room, to invest in their project. At the launch of the site, Dave was a junior and Catherine was a sophomore; the project was initially activated at Montgomery High School, in suburban New Jersey where they attended. The site was created entirely by workers in India.

In 2006, myYearbook raised $4.1 million from U.S. Venture Partners and First Round Capital. In 2008, it raised $13 million in a Series B round.

Features
In July 2011, myYearbook announced it had agreed to be acquired by Latino social networking site Quepasa.

In June 2012, the company formed from the combination of myYearbook and Quepasa was renamed MeetMe. This change is because "Yearbook" means more about meeting friends from the past while "MeetMe" would convey the meaning of users making new friends, which is what the website is intended for.

In October 2016, MeetMe acquired Skout, a global mobile app for meeting new people, for $55 million.

On April 3, 2017, the company acquired if(we) and rebranded it to The Meet Group.

In September 2017, Meet Group acquired German dating app Lovoo

In 2020, The Meet Group was acquired by ProSiebenSat.1 Media with a parent company, ParshipMeet Group, being formed to manage both The Meet Group and Parship.

See also

 Facebook
 MySpace
 List of social networking websites

References

External links

CEO Geoff Cook Interview; Online Personals Watch, October 2013
CEO Geoff Cook Interview; Online Personals Watch, November 2014
Inc. magazine profile of Catherine and Geoff Cook

American social networking websites
Companies formerly listed on the Nasdaq
Internet properties established in 2005
Yearbooks
2014 initial public offerings
Companies based in Bucks County, Pennsylvania